Gregor Justin "Gore" Verbinski (born March 16, 1964) is an American film director, screenwriter, producer, and musician. He is best known for directing The Ring, the first three Pirates of the Caribbean films, and Rango. He won the Academy Award, the BAFTA, and was nominated for the Golden Globe Award for Best Animated Feature Film for his work on Rango.

Early life
Verbinski was born in Oak Ridge, Tennessee, the fourth of five children of Laurette Ann (née McGovern) and Victor Vincent Verbinski, a nuclear physicist.  His father was of Polish descent.

Career

Music career
Verbinski was active in several L.A. rock bands early in his career. He played guitar in the Daredevils, Bulldozer, The Drivers, and the all-star band The Cylon Boys Choir. He was also in a band called The Little Kings, which backed Stiv Bators on his version of "Have Love Will Travel" with amateur  drummer Chris "Poobah" Bailey. Along with a cover of the Moody Blues song "The Story in Your Eyes" (by other musicians), the song was released by Bators in the Fall of 1986 as a 12-inch single on Bomp! (catalogue #12136) and was later included in Bators' compilation album L.A. L.A. On the compilation album's liner notes, label owner Greg Shaw described the band as "an adequate but rootless Hollywood glam-damaged band with tattoos".

Film career
His first films were a series of 8 mm films called "The Driver Files" c. 1979, when he was a young teen. After graduating from film school at UCLA, he got his first job as a script reader at the commercial production company Limelight in 1987. After director Julien Temple viewed some of his work, he signed to his production company Nitrate Films, and later Palomar Pictures, where he directed music videos for bands like Vicious Rumors, Bad Religion, NOFX, 24-7 Spyz and Monster Magnet. Verbinski moved from music videos to commercials, where he worked for many brand names including Nike, Coca-Cola, Canon, Skittles and United Airlines. One of his most famous commercials was for Budweiser, featuring frogs who croak the brand name. For his efforts in commercials, Verbinski won four Clio Awards and one Cannes Advertising Silver Lion.

Verbinski started Blind Wink Productions in April 2005.

After completing a short film, The Ritual (which he both wrote and directed), Verbinski made his feature film directing debut with Mouse Hunt. The film was a hit globally and he soon followed up the success with the action/comedy The Mexican, starring Julia Roberts and Brad Pitt. The film received mixed reviews, and performed modestly at the box-office, earning $68 million domestically which was quite meager considering its star power (it was technically successful due to its moderately low $38 million budget). Verbinski followed it up with the horror film remake The Ring (2002), which struck gold globally, grossing well over $200 million worldwide. Verbinski also had a directorial hand in The Time Machine that year, temporarily taking over for an exhausted Simon Wells.  Verbinski directed some of the underground Morlock sequences and is given a Thanks to credit in the film.

He then directed the very successful Pirates of the Caribbean: The Curse of the Black Pearl which earned over $600 million at the international box office. This was his first collaboration with producer Jerry Bruckheimer, whom he has since collaborated with on several other movies. His next film was The Weather Man, which starred Nicolas Cage. The film received mixed to positive reviews but was a box office failure. In March 2005, he started filming the sequels Pirates of the Caribbean: Dead Man's Chest and Pirates of the Caribbean: At World's End. The former then became his biggest success so far, becoming the third film ever to gross over $1 billion at the international box office. In 2008, Verbinski's Blind Wink production company signed a deal with Universal. Verbinski was also set to direct a film for Universal based on the video game BioShock. Verbinski was then replaced by Juan Carlos Fresnadillo as director and the film was subsequently cancelled.

In 2011 and 2013, Verbinski would delve into the Western genre, with decidedly different results: Rango was well received, critically and commercially, and earned the Academy Award for Best Animated Feature. However, his adaptation of the 1930s radio hero, The Lone Ranger for Disney, was not, the project having been stuck in development hell for several years, undergone rewrites and budget cuts, and gained controversy for the casting of Johnny Depp as the Native American Tonto. The film grossed $260 million against a $215–225 million budget, plus an estimated $150–160 million marketing campaign. That same year, he was also the executive producer of the Ben Stiller adaptation of The Secret Life of Walter Mitty, after being attached as director for several years.

In 2016, Verbinski's horror film A Cure for Wellness starring Dane DeHaan premiered at the Alamo Drafthouse before receiving a wide release in 2017. It received mediocre reviews from critics and was a financial bomb, grossing $26.6 million against a $40 million budget.

Verbinski was set to direct a film centering around Gambit, set within the X-Men film universe, before dropping out of the project in January 2018.

Other projects
Verbinski was involved with Matter, an original futuristic videogame that was being developed for the Xbox 360 using Kinect. Announced at E3 2012, Verbinski later confirmed that the game is now cancelled.

Filmography

Films

Executive producer
 The Secret Life of Walter Mitty (2013)

Music videos

Awards received by Verbinski movies

References

External links

1964 births
Living people
People from Oak Ridge, Tennessee
American animated film directors
American animated film producers
American people of Polish descent
American music video directors
UCLA Film School alumni
Animation screenwriters
Annie Award winners
Action film directors
Fantasy film directors
Horror film directors
Directors of Best Animated Feature Academy Award winners
Film directors from Tennessee
Advertising directors